Omens is the second album of the band Sorrowful Angels. It was recorded between October and December 2012. All music and lyrics are credited to Dion Christodoulatos.

Track listing

Credits

Sorrowful Angels
Dion Christodoulatos – vocals, lead guitar, music and lyrics
Apollwn Siakandaris – rhythm guitar
George Moudaneas – bass guitar
Fivos Andriopoulos – drums

Production
Dion Christodoulatos – production, mixing

Artwork
Themis "Fad" Ioannou – album artwork and photography

References

2012 albums
Sorrowful Angels albums